Tăuții-Măgherăuș is a town in Maramureș County, Romania. The town administers six villages: Băița (Láposbánya), Bozânta Mare (Nagybozinta), Bușag (Buság), Merișor, Nistru (Miszbánya) and Ulmoasa (Szilas). Tăuții-Măgherăuș was declared a town in 2004. The Baia Mare Airport is located in the town.

Demographics

In 2002, 84.3% of inhabitants were Romanians, 14.4% Hungarians and 1% Roma. 78.3% were Romanian Orthodox, 12.1% Roman Catholic, 3.9% Greek-Catholic and 3.5% Reformed.

References

Populated places in Maramureș County
Towns in Romania
Mining communities in Romania